Assigny is a former commune in the Seine-Maritime department in the Normandy region in north-western France. On 1 January 2016, it was merged into the new commune of Petit-Caux.

Geography

Heraldry

Population

Places of interest
 The church of St. Médard, dating from the twelfth century.
 The château dating from the sixteenth century
 A wind farm, on the outskirts of the commune.

See also
Communes of the Seine-Maritime department

References

External links

 Website showing photos of Assigny and the region 

Former communes of Seine-Maritime